American International School (AIS) may refer to:

 American International School of Algiers, Algeria
 American International School of Sydney, Australia
 American International School of Vienna, Austria
 American International School of Dhaka, Bangladesh
 American International School of Guangzhou, China
 American International School of Costa Rica
 American International School of Zagreb, Croatia
 American International School of Libreville, Gabon
 American International School of Accra, Ghana
 American International School Hong Kong
 American International School Chennai, India
 Walworth Barbour American International School in Israel
 American International School of Kuwait
 American International School of Bamako, Mali
 American International School in Gaza, Palestine
 American International School of Bucharest, Romania
 American International School – Riyadh, Saudi Arabia
 American International School of Cape Town, South Africa
 American International School of Johannesburg, South Africa
 American International School of Zurich, Switzerland
 American International School, Abu Dhabi, United Arab Emirates
 American International School, Saigon, Vietnam

See also

 
 American School (disambiguation)